The 2012 CONCACAF Futsal Championship was the fifth edition of the main international futsal tournament of the North and Central America and the Caribbean region. It took place in Guatemala City, Guatemala from 2 to 8 July 2012.

The tournament served as a qualifying tournament for the 2012 FIFA Futsal World Cup in Thailand.

Qualifying

CFU (Caribbean Football Union) Qualifying Tournament
Saint Kitts and Nevis advanced automatically to the final round of a 2012 CONCACAF Futsal Championship after the Dominican Republic, Guyana, Haiti and Trinidad & Tobago withdrew from regional qualifying. Cuba was to host a Caribbean qualifying event 17–23 February.

Playoff
Canada and El Salvador competed for the fourth spot in Group A.

|}

Championship
The eight participating teams were divided into two groups of four which each played on a single round-robin format. The top two teams of each group advanced to semi-finals. The top four teams from the tournament earned participation at the 2012 Futsal World Cup. The draw was held on 12 April 2012 at the Intercontinental Hotel in Guatemala City. The schedule of matches was released on 23 April 2012.

Group A

Group B

Knockout stage

Semi-finals

Third place play-off

Final

Winner

Final standing

Top goalscorers
The top 10 scorers from the 2012 CONCACAF Futsal Championship are as follows:

Source:

References

CONCACAF Futsal Championship
International futsal competitions hosted by Guatemala
CON
Concacaf Futsal Championship, 2012
Fut
2012 FIFA Futsal World Cup